Patriarch Isidore of Constantinople may refer to:

 Isidore I of Constantinople, Ecumenical Patriarch in 1347–1350
 Isidore II of Constantinople, Ecumenical Patriarch in 1456–1462